Snake River a major river of the greater Pacific Northwest region in the United States.

Snake River may also refer to:

Rivers

Canada
Snake River (Sahtaneh River tributary), British Columbia
Snake River (Renfrew County), Ontario
Snake River (Yukon)

United States
Snake River (Nome, Alaska) 
Snake River (Nushagak Bay), Alaska
Snake River (Colorado)
Snake River (Massachusetts)
Snake River (Michigan)
Snake River (Elk River), Minnesota
Snake River (Isabella River tributary), Minnesota
Snake River (Red River of the North tributary), Minnesota
Snake River (St. Croix River tributary), Minnesota
Snake River (Nebraska)

Other uses
Snake River High School, near Blackfoot, Idaho, U.S.

See also